Langford is a city on southern Vancouver Island in the province of British Columbia, Canada. Langford is one of the 13 component municipalities of Greater Victoria and is within the Capital Regional District. Langford was incorporated in 1992 and has a population of over 40,000 people.  Its municipal neighbours are Colwood to the southeast, Highlands to the north, Metchosin to the southwest, and View Royal to the northeast.

History 
The City of Langford was incorporated on December 8, 1992. Langford's history of European settlement dates back to 1851, when Captain Edward Langford established one of the four Hudson's Bay Company farms in the Victoria area. In the early 1860s, the region of Langford experienced a short-lived gold rush in what is now Goldstream Provincial Park. The area was once a favourite recreation destination for thousands of Victorians in the late 1800s: day-trippers travelled via railway to the popular country resort Goldstream House Hotel; hunters built their lodges on the shores of the lakes near the mountains; and a summer colony of the well-to-do city folk relaxed and socialized at Langford Lake.

The region has become the fastest-growing on Vancouver Island, with big retail stores and new residential developments, and the expanding suburban town of Langford became a city in 2003. The motto of Langford is "Golden in setting, determined in Spirit," containing a reference to the natural beauty of the City of Langford, specifically Goldstream Provincial Park, and a comment on the community's drive to enhance Langford's special character and future.

Langford Lake was named for Captain Edward E. Langford who arrived with his family in 1851 as the first English family to emigrate to the Colony of Vancouver Island. He was the manager of the Esquimalt farm owned by the Puget Sound Agricultural Company, a subsidiary of the Hudson's Bay Company. He returned to England in 1861.

Attractions 
Langford is the fastest growing community in British Columbia and the third fastest growing city in Canada, attracting new residents from all over Greater Victoria, the Lower Mainland, Ontario, and Alberta due to new housing developments, a strong real estate market and affordability, a desirable temperate climate with warm, dry summers and mild, wet winters, ample amenities as the commercial centre of West Shore, and year-long recreational activities.

Although the pace of development and some planning decisions (particularly "big-box" retail developments and aggressive suburban sprawl) have attracted criticism, the community continues to grow rapidly and attract residents. Population in 2018 surpassed 40,000. It is the largest municipality in the Western Communities, and third-largest in the Capital Regional District after Saanich and Victoria.

Activities in Langford include shopping at the many retail stores at Millstream Village and Westshore Town Centre (formerly Canwest Mall) with its 55 stores and services including major department, grocery, and retail chain stores as well as a seven-screen Cineplex movie theatre.

Langford's city parks include City Centre Park, with a family-friendly entertainment zone including a Family Fun Park, and Veterans Memorial Park located in the heart of downtown, and at the center a cenotaph commemorating the men and women of the Canadian Forces who have given their lives in the line of duty and where Langford holds its yearly Remembrance Day ceremony.

Community events include parades, a seasonal farmer's market, the Summer Festival, and Luxton Fair. Rugby Canada has its headquarters in Langford practising at Starlight Stadium. A new $30 million YMCA/YWCA Aquatic Centre opened in May 2016, acclaimed by the mayor to be the "biggest project in the history of Langford", and features multiple pools, recreation facilities and a new library.

Visitors can also participate in go-karting and mini-golfing, and watch stock-car racing and a demolition derby at Western Speedway. Langford is home to world-class golf courses including Bear Mountain Resort on Skirt Mountain. The large community resort offers a system of mountain bike trails as the training centre for the Canadian National Mountain Bike Team and is planning the development of clay tennis courts for the national team and a professional disc golf course.

There are many lakes in the area for fishing, swimming and non-motorized boating including Langford, Glen and Florence Lake. Langford is known for the many nature parks and a network of trails popular with hikers and walkers alike including Mill Hill Park, Mount Wells, Thetis Lake Regional Park and the challenging high-elevation Mount Finlayson. Cyclists enjoy the picturesque multi-use Galloping Goose Trail, formerly a railway line, that moves through urban and rural parts of Langford and is used as a commuter trail to downtown Victoria, approximately 45 minutes away by bicycle. Goldstream Provincial Park is a large  nature reserve home to old-growth trees, waterfalls, estuaries and a visitor center and Nature House offering many visitor activities such as camping, picnicking, hiking, and wildlife watching like eagle viewing during the annual salmon run.

Geography
Langford is the urban core of the five suburban municipalities comprising the region of West Shore for a combined population of about 75,000. Notable physical features of Langford include the three prominent lakes (Langford Lake, Glen Lake and Florence Lake) and the Humpback Reservoir, several peaks such as Mount Finlayson and Mount Wells, and the notable Goldstream Provincial Park. The Malahat drive, part of the Trans-Canada Highway, begins in Langford, and the Galloping Goose Regional Trail and the Island Rail Corridor cross the city.

Langford enjoys a temperate climate with mild temperatures and distinct dry and rainy seasons. Most built-up areas in Langford are on basalt bedrock, while lower-lying regions of the Langford Plain from Langford Lake to Royal Bay are glacial till, and Happy Valley and Goldstream River valley are on deep sand of the Colwood Delta.

Old growth forestlands were once abundant in Langford but urban sprawl threatens natural habitat including coastal Douglas fir, western red cedar, arbutus trees and Garry oak ecosystems. The last remaining pockets of arbutus groves and Garry oak meadows are unique to southern Vancouver Island and only about five percent of the ecosystems remain in their natural state. The unique Mediterranean characteristics of the island's climate support the Garry oak ecosystem in the few remaining undeveloped areas of Langford, and are under threat due to rapid growth, high-density subdivisions, and urbanization.

Demographics

The median household income in 2015 for Langford was $80,331, which is almost 15% higher than the British Columbia provincial average of $69,995.

Ethnicity 

Note: Totals greater than 100% due to multiple origin responses.

Religion 
According to the 2021 census, religious groups in Langford included:
Irreligion (28,590 persons or 61.9%)
Christianity (14,450 persons or 31.3%)
Islam (685 persons or 1.5%)
Hinduism (625 persons or 1.4%)
Sikhism (600 persons or 1.3%)
Buddhism (370 persons or 0.8%)
Judaism (220 persons or 0.5%)
Indigenous Spirituality (65 persons or 0.1%)

Neighbourhoods 
 (South) Langford Proper/ Goldstream Village/ Langford Lake 
 Humpback/ Goldstream Meadows
 Westhills 
 Glen Lake 
 Luxton/ Happy Valley
 Triangle Mountain/ Walfred  
 Olympic View/ Latoria 
 Mill Hill/ Atkins
 North Langford/ Millstream
 Thetis Heights
 Florence Lake
 Bear Mountain

Notable people 
 Tyson Barrie, NHL player
 Ryder Hesjedal, Canadian Olympian and professional racing cyclist
 John Horgan, Former Premier of British Columbia
 Moka Only, musician
 Bob Rock, musician
 Jennifer Tilly, actor
 Meg Tilly, actor

Education 
Langford is a part of the School District 62 Sooke with approximately 10,000 students in Sooke, Port Renfrew, Metchosin, Colwood and Langford. Ten of the 25 schools are in Langford including one middle school and one high school. In 2015, two new state-of-the-art high schools were built to a LEED Gold standard to replace the 65-year-old Belmont high school: lake-front Belmont Secondary School (the largest on Vancouver Island) in Langford with a capacity of 1,200-students, and the ocean-side Royal Bay Secondary School in Colwood with 800 students. Both high schools are already overcapacity due to rapidly expanding region. There is also the Westshore Centre for Learning and Training, and the Lighthouse Christian Academy which serves Kindergarten to Grade 12.

Notable features 
Langford is an evolving community, outgrowing its reputation as the rough "redneck" suburban outskirts of Victoria. Former Mayor Stew Young and city council proposed major upkeep and tidiness of the central downtown district and the city has received numerous community showcase awards including the Provincial "Communities in Bloom" Award. Council were winners of the 2014 Golden Scissors Award by The Canadian Federation of Independent Business (CFIB) for their simple but transformative initiative of making business licences permanent.

Langford council has also set up a program for developing affordable housing that once required developers of new subdivisions within the City of Langford to build one affordable home for every 10 single-family lots subdivided. The first Canadian community based on the LEED environmental standard, Westhills, was developed near Langford Lake.

Langford has three fire stations with a mix of 60 volunteer and career members. Every year in mid-December, Langford hosts an annual fire truck parade which features decorated emergency vehicles from around the province.

The region is policed by the West Shore detachment of the Royal Canadian Mounted Police. Additionally, Langford is also home to the central BC Ambulance 911 call center, located at 2764 Leigh Rd, which provides 911 dispatch services to Vancouver Island and the surrounding islands.

Notes

References

External links 

Populated places on the British Columbia Coast
Cities in British Columbia
Populated places in the Capital Regional District
Greater Victoria